The United States Hang Gliding and Paragliding Association (USHPA) is a non-profit organization supporting foot-launched soaring flight in the United States. It began in 1971 as the Southern California Hang Gliding Association and became national in scope by the mid-1970s. When paragliding became popular in the U.S., the American Paragliding Association was formed. That eventually merged into the USHPA (then called the U.S. Hang Gliding Association). In 2006, paragliding was added to the organization name to reflect its growing contingent of paraglider pilot members.

USHPA is the Fédération Aéronautique Internationale recognized body representing motorless hang gliding and paragliding competition and records in the United States.

The organization provides a pilot proficiency program for foot-launched soaring pilots and instructors. It is available at the organization's website.

The organization has created and then abused the perception that their rating system is part of a legal standard in the United States.  The FAA under FAR 103 has explicitly stated that no rating is required for ultralight.  USHPA is continuously working to gain exclusive access to both public and private land based on the assertion that their rating system is required to ensure pilot proficiency.

External links

 USHPA - The US Hang Gliding & Paragliding Association Website

Non-profit organizations based in the United States
Hang gliding
Paragliding
1971 in aviation USHPA founded.
Aviation history of the United States